Gardnar Mulloy and Budge Patty were the defending champions, but lost to Ramanathan Krishnan and Naresh Kumar in the third round.

Sven Davidson and Ulf Schmidt defeated Ashley Cooper and Neale Fraser in the final, 6–4, 6–4, 8–6 to win the gentlemen's doubles tennis title at the 1958 Wimbledon Championship.

Seeds

  Ashley Cooper /  Neale Fraser (final)
  Gardnar Mulloy /  Budge Patty (third round)
  Barry MacKay /  Mervyn Rose (semifinals)
  Bob Howe /  Abe Segal (third round)

Draw

Finals

Top half

Section 1

Section 2

Bottom half

Section 3

Section 4

References

External links

Men's Doubles
Wimbledon Championship by year – Men's doubles